McClaughry is a surname. Notable people with the surname include:

Robert Wilson McClaughry (1839–1920), American prison warden and reformer
Wilfred McClaughry (1894–1943), Australian aviator and air commander
William McClaughry, American slave